Saint John is an unincorporated community in Campbell Township, Warrick County, in the U.S. state of Indiana.

History
The community took its name from Saint Johns Church.

Geography

References

Unincorporated communities in Warrick County, Indiana
Unincorporated communities in Indiana